A thunderbolt or lightning bolt is a symbolic representation of lightning when accompanied by a loud thunderclap. In Indo-European mythology, the thunderbolt was identified with the 'Sky Father'; this association is also found in later Hellenic representations of Zeus and Vedic descriptions of the vajra wielded by the god Indra. It may have been a symbol of cosmic order, as expressed in the fragment from Heraclitus describing "the Thunderbolt that steers the course of all things".

In its original usage the word may also have been a description of the consequences of a close approach between two planetary cosmic bodies, as Plato suggested in Timaeus, or, according to Victor Clube, meteors, though this is not currently the case. As a divine manifestation the thunderbolt has been a powerful symbol throughout history, and has appeared in many mythologies. Drawing from this powerful association, the thunderbolt is often found in military symbolism and semiotic representations of electricity.

In religion and mythology 

Lightning plays a role in many mythologies, often as the weapon of a sky god and weather god. As such, it is an unsurpassed method of dramatic instantaneous retributive destruction: thunderbolts as divine weapons can be found in many mythologies.
in the Torah, the word for 'arrow', is used for the "arrows" of YHWH/Elohim, which are represented as lightnings in Habakuk 3:11, but also as general calamities inflicted on men as divine punishment in Deuteronomy 32:42, Psalm 64:7, Job 6:4, etc.
In Christianity, One of its most significant verses is Deuteronomy 6:4, Verses 6:4–5 were also quoted by Jesus in Mark 12:28–34 as the Great Commandment. The Second Coming of Jesus is compared to lightning. With the establishment of Christianity, it passed into popular belief that lightning is the fire that leaves behind the chariot of the Prophet Elijah as it runs through the sky, while thunder is the rattle of the feet of the horses that drag his chariot. According to another tradition, lightning and thunder are more island-like are the cannons fired by the Archangel Michael against Satan.
Indo-European traditions
 In Hittite (and Hurrian) mythology, a triple thunderbolt was one symbol of Teshub (Tarhunt).
 Vedic religion (and later Hindu mythology) the god Indra is the god of lightning. His main weapon is the thunderbolt (Vajra).
 In Greek mythology, the thunderbolt is a weapon given to Zeus by the Cyclopes. Based on this, in Roman mythology, the thunderbolt is a weapon given to Jupiter by the Cyclopes, and is thus one of the emblems of Jupiter, often depicted on Greek and Roman coins and elsewhere as an eagle holding in its claws a thunderbolt which resembles in form a bundle of  crossed sticks.
 In Celtic mythology, Taranis is the god of thunder, in Irish, Tuireann.
 In Norse mythology, Thor is specifically the god of thunder and lightning, wielding Mjolnir
 In Slavic mythology, Perun is the god of the sky, controlling storms, thunder and lightning and wields the Axe of Perun.
 In Finnish mythology, Ukko is the god of thunder and lightning, wielding Ukonvasara.
 In Turkish mythology, Bayülgen creates the thunderbolts.
 In Maya mythology, Huracan is sometimes represented as three thunderbolts.
 In Guaraní mythology, Tupã is the embodiment of thunder and has power over lightning.
 In Cherokee mythology, the Ani Hyuntikwalaski ("thunder beings") cause lightning fire in a hollow sycamore tree.
 In Ojibway mythology, thunder is created by the Thunderbirds (Nimkiig or Binesiiwag), which can be both benevolent and malevolent to human beings.
 In Igbo mythology, the thunderbolt is the weapon of Amadioha/Amadiora.
 In Yoruba mythology, the thunderbolt is the weapon of Shango.
 In Tibetan Buddhism, the Vajra or thunderbolt is symbol of Vajrayana branch.
 In Paleo-Balkan mythology, Zibelthiurdos (also "Zbelsurdos", "Zibelthurdos"): a god recognized as similar to the Greek Zeus as a wielder of lightning and thunderbolts.
 In Navajo mythology, the hero twins, Naʼídígishí and Naayééʼ Neizghání, have bows that shoot thunderbolts as arrows.
 In Chinese mythology, Lei Gong uses thunderbolts as a weapon and his wife, Dian Mu, creates the accompanying lightning flashes with her mirror.

Thunderstones 
The name "thunderbolt" or "thunderstone" has also been traditionally applied to the fossilised rostra of belemnoids. The origin of these bullet-shaped stones was not understood, and thus a mythological explanation of stones created where a lightning struck has arisen.

In the modern world 
The thunderbolt or lightning bolt continues into the modern world as a prominent symbol; it has entered modern heraldry and military iconography.

In iconography 
 The thunderbolt is used as an electrical symbol.
 A thunderbolt is used in the logo of the Australian hard rock band AC/DC.
 A thunderbolt is used in the logo of the German car manufacturer Opel.
 The logo of the People's Action Party in Singapore.
 The thunderbolt used by squatters as their insignia.
 Numerous fascist organizations such as the Schutzstaffel, the British Union of Fascists, and the Union of Bulgarian National Legions (SBNL) have historically used thunderbolts as their symbols.

In fiction 
 In the DC Universe, the thunderbolt is the symbol seen on the chest (or entire torso) of the costumes worn by Shazam, the Flash, Lightning Lad, Lightning Lass, Black Lightning, and Static.
 In the Marvel Universe the thunderbolt is the symbol seen on the torso of the costumes worn by Electro, Quicksilver, Black Bolt, Speed Demon, Ms. Marvel, and is also the name of a superhero team.
 The thunderbolt is used in the logo of the Power Rangers franchise.
 In the Harry Potter franchise, the scar on Harry's forehead is in the shape of a thunderbolt.
 The letter "P" in the Harry Potter logo is also stylized in the shape of a thunderbolt.
 In the novel The Godfather, "being hit with the thunderbolt" is an Italian expression (colpo di fulmine) referring to a man being spellbound at the sight of a beautiful woman (like the so-called love at first sight).  The novel's emerging main character is affected in this fashion and eventually marries a woman whose appearance initially affects him in this way.

As a mascot   
The thunderbolt is the mascot of:

 Cranston High School East in Cranston, Rhode Island.
 Mica Mountain High School in Vail, Arizona.
 Northmont High School, in Clayton, Ohio.

Gallery

See also 
 Mjölnir
 Thunderstone (folklore)
 Vajra

References

External links 

 Quasi-realtime thunderbolt information in Japan (Japanese)

Mythological weapons
Lightning